William Giffard (died 23 January 1129), was the Lord Chancellor of England of William II and Henry I, from 1093 to 1101, and Bishop of Winchester (1100–1129).

Giffard was the son of Walter Giffard, Lord of Longueville and Ermengarde, daughter of Gerard Flaitel. He also held the office of Dean of Rouen prior to his election as bishop. On 3 August 1100 he became bishop of Winchester by nomination of Henry I. Henry nominated him probably in an attempt to win the support of the clergy in Henry's bid to claim the throne directly after the death of William Rufus.  He was one of the bishops elect whom Archbishop Anselm of Canterbury refused to consecrate in 1101 as having been nominated and invested by the lay power.

During the investitures dispute Giffard was on friendly terms with Anselm, and drew upon himself a sentence of banishment through declining to accept consecration from Gerard Archbishop of York in 1103. He was, however, one of the bishops who pressed Anselm, in 1106, to give way to the king. He was finally consecrated after the settlement of 1107 on 11 August and became a close friend of Archbishop Anselm. As bishop, William aided the first Cistercians to settle in England, when in 1128 he brought monks from L'Aumône Abbey in France to settle at Waverley Abbey. He also restored Winchester Cathedral with great magnificence.

Among Giffard's actions as bishop was the refounding of a religious house at Taunton and the staffing of it with Austin canons. The canons were drawn from Merton Priory. He was known for the close and good relations that he had with the monks of his cathedral chapter, sharing their meals and sleeping with them instead of in his own room.

Giffard died shortly before 25 January 1129, the date he was buried.

Notes

References
 
 
 British History Online Bishops of Winchester accessed on 2 November 2007
 
 
 
 
 
 

11th-century births
Year of birth unknown
1129 deaths
Anglo-Normans
Lord chancellors of England
Bishops of Winchester
12th-century English Roman Catholic bishops
Burials at Winchester Cathedral